Yanbakty (Yanbaqtı) is a rural locality (a village) in Balyshlinsky Selsoviet, Blagovarsky District, Bashkortostan, Russia. The population was 59 as of 2010. There is 1 street.

Geography 
Yanbakty is located 10 km northwest of Yazykovo (the district's administrative centre) by road.

References 

Rural localities in Blagovarsky District